Events during the year 1939 in Northern Ireland.

Incumbents
 Governor - 	 The Duke of Abercorn 
 Prime Minister - James Craig

Events
7 March – Harland and Wolff's Belfast shipyard launched the ocean liner  for Royal Mail Lines.
17 April – Prime Minister of Northern Ireland Lord Craigavon, dismissed the Republic of Ireland government's position of neutrality as "cowardly".
4 May – The Prime Minister of Northern Ireland announced that conscription would not be extended to Northern Ireland.
17 August – Harland and Wolff's Belfast shipyard launched the aircraft carrier  for the Royal Navy.
3 September – The United Kingdom declared war on Germany following the German invasion of Poland on 1 September.

Arts and literature
 18 May – Louis MacNeice's Autumn Journal: a poem was published.
 June – The Northern Ireland Players performed Joseph Tomelty's Barnum is Right as their first commercial stage play.

Sport

Football
Irish League
Winners: Belfast Celtic

Irish Cup
Winners: Linfield 2 – 0 Ballymena United

Births
1 January – Billy Reid, volunteer in Provisional Irish Republican Army (killed in gunfight with British Army 1971)
13 April – Seamus Heaney, poet, writer and winner of the Nobel Prize in Literature (died 2013)
17 May – Eddie Magill, footballer and football manager
6 July – Mary Peters, pentathlete and 1972 Summer Olympics gold medal winner
27 July – Michael Longley, poet
9 August – Vincent Hanna, television journalist (died 1997)
16 August – Seán Brady, Archbishop of Armagh and Primate of All Ireland
11 October – Austin Currie, founder-member of the Social Democratic and Labour Party (SDLP), Fine Gael TD (died 2021)
8 December – James Galway, flautist
Undated – Éamonn O'Doherty, sculptor (died 2011)

Deaths
2 February – Amanda McKittrick Ros, novelist and poet noted for her purple prose (born 1860)
20 September – Andrew Claude de la Cherois Crommelin, astronomer (born 1865)

See also
1939 in Scotland
1939 in Wales

References